The Hoffmann H40 was a prototype sport aircraft built in Germany in 1988. Designed by Wolf Hoffmann based on his Dimona motor-glider, it was a conventional, low-wing monoplane with side-by-side seating for two and tricycle undercarriage. The aircraft's high aspect ratio wings and T-tail were carried over from its motorglider heritage, but the span was shorter than that of the Dimona. Construction throughout was of composite materials. Hoffmann intended this aircraft to compete with sporting two-seaters such as the Grob G 115 and Robin ATL, but was unable to find the financial backing to bring the aircraft to market, despite a 30% share bought in the project by German pump manufacturer ABS.

Specifications

References

 
 

 
 
 
 

1980s German sport aircraft
Hoffmann aircraft
Low-wing aircraft
Single-engined tractor aircraft
Aircraft first flown in 1988